National Tertiary Route 326, or just Route 326 (or ) is a National Road Route of Costa Rica, located in the San José province.

Description
In San José province, the route covers Pérez Zeledón canton (El General, Cajón districts).

References

Highways in Costa Rica